Adrian Z. Diaz is an American law enforcement officer serving as the chief of the Seattle Police Department. Diaz had previously served as deputy chief of the department. Diaz assumed office in an acting capacity on September 2, 2020, following the resignation of Carmen Best. On September 20, 2022, Diaz was appointed to the permanent position.

Education 
Diaz earned a Bachelor of Arts in criminal justice from Central Washington University and a Master of Public Administration from the University of Washington.

Career 
Diaz previously worked as a bike patrolman and undercover officer in the Seattle Police Department. He also works as a Master Defensive Tactics instructor at the Washington State Criminal Justice Training Commission.

References 

Living people
American law enforcement officials
Chiefs of the Seattle Police Department
Central Washington University alumni
University of Washington alumni
Year of birth missing (living people)